George Cole may refer to:

Arts and entertainment
 George Cole (artist) (1810–1883), English landscape painter, father of George Vicat Cole
 George Vicat Cole (1833–1893), English painter
 G. Emerson Cole (1919–2012), George Emerson Cole, American TV and radio announcer, DJ
 George Cole (actor) (1925–2015), British film and television actor
 George Cole (musician) (born 1960), American guitarist, gypsy jazz, bluegrass

Military
 George W. Cole (1827–1875), officer in the Union Army during the American Civil War
 George M. Cole (1853–1933), British-born American major general
 George Cole (British Army officer) (1911–1973), British Army general

Politics 
 George B. Cole (1900–1970), Canadian politician
 George Edward Cole (1826–1906), U.S. delegate from the Territory of Washington
 George James Cole, Baron Cole (1911–1979), British industrialist and politician
 George Cole (Tasmanian politician) (1908–1969), Australian senator for Tasmania
 George Ward Cole (1793–1879), Australian politician, member of Victorian Legislative Council
 George Cole (South Australian politician) (1823–1893), South Australian abolitionist politician

Sports 
 George Cole (cricketer) (1885–1964), English cricketer
 George Cole (American football) (1906–1978), American football player, coach, and college athletics administrator
 George Cole (footballer), Gambian footballer in 2005 FIFA U-17 World Championship squads and List of Estonian football transfers winter 2012–13

Other 
 Sir George Cole (died 1624), English barrister
 George Watson Cole (1850–1939), American librarian and bibliographer
 G. D. H. Cole (1889–1959), English political theorist, economist, and historian

See also
 George Coles (disambiguation)
 George Cole (academic)
 George C. Cole a.k.a. Paul St. Peter, American voice actor